Jean Alquier-Bouffard (24 October 1893 – 1 June 1922) was a French equestrian. He competed in the individual jumping event at the 1920 Summer Olympics.

References

External links
 

1893 births
1922 deaths
French male equestrians
Olympic equestrians of France
Equestrians at the 1920 Summer Olympics
Sportspeople from Tarn (department)